Allium drummondii, also known as Drummond's onion, wild garlic and prairie onion, is a North American species of onion native to the southern Great Plains of North America. It is found in South Dakota, Kansas, Nebraska, Colorado, Oklahoma, Arkansas, Texas, New Mexico, and northeastern Mexico.

Allium drummondii is a bulb-forming perennial. The flowers appear in April and May, in a variety of colors ranging from white to pink.  It is common, considered invasive in some regions.

Uses
This species of Allium is gathered by Native Americans for its small edible bulbs.  These contain a considerable amount of inulin, a non-reducing sugar that humans cannot digest.  Because of this, these onions must be heated for a long period of time in order to convert the inulin into digestible sugars.

References

External links
 

drummondii
Flora of the Great Plains (North America)
Flora of the United States
Flora of the North-Central United States
Flora of the South-Central United States
Flora of Northeastern Mexico
Garlic
Plants described in 1875
Taxa named by Eduard August von Regel